The Reformed Church in Romania is the organization of the Calvinist church in Romania.
The majority of its followers are of Hungarian ethnicity and Hungarian is the main church language. The large majority of the Church's parishes are in Transylvania; according to the 2002 census, 701,077 people or 3.15% of the total population belong to the Reformed Church. About 95% of the members were of Hungarian ethnicity.

The religious institution is composed of two bishoprics, the Reformed Diocese of Királyhágómellék and the Reformed Diocese of Transylvania. The headquarters are at Oradea and Cluj-Napoca, respectively.

Together with the Unitarian Church of Transylvania and the two Lutheran churches of Romania (the Evangelical Lutheran Church in Romania and the Evangelical Church of Augustan Confession), the Calvinist community runs the Protestant Theological Institute of Cluj.

Doctrine 
The church adheres to the:

Creeds 
Apostle Creed
Nicene Creed
Athanasian Creed

Confessions 
Heidelberg Catechism
Second Helvetic Confession

Gallery

References

External links 
 Official website of the Transylvanian district 
 Official website of the Királyhágómellék district (Banat, Crișana and Maramureș) 

Reformed Church in Romania
Hungarians in Romania
Religion in Transylvania
Reformed denominations in Europe
Members of the World Alliance of Reformed Churches